Piermont is a town in Grafton County, New Hampshire, United States. The population was 769 at the 2020 census. It is home to Camp Walt Whitman and Kingswood Camp for Boys.

History
Incorporated by Governor Benning Wentworth in 1764 and settled in 1768, the town takes its name from Italy's Piedmont. It had 426 residents in 1790, the year of the first census.

Aaron Lane, who grew up in Piermont, was the first permanent settler in the Mojave Desert area now known as Victorville, California. A biography of Lane sheds light on life in Piermont during the mid-19th century.

Geography
It is drained by Indian Pond Brook, Eastman Brook and Bean Brook, tributaries of the Connecticut River, which forms the western boundary. The southeast corner of the town drains south to Upper Baker Pond in Orford, part of the Merrimack River watershed. The town is home to Lake Tarleton, which takes its name from its erstwhile owner, Colonel William Tarleton, who was a delegate to the Constitutional Convention of 1791. Lake Armington feeds Lake Tarleton from the south.

Piermont is bordered by the towns of Haverhill to the north, Warren to the east, Wentworth to the southeast, Orford to the south, and Bradford, Vermont, across the Connecticut River to the west.

Transportation

Road 
Piermont is crossed by New Hampshire state routes NH-10, NH-25 and NH-25C. Interstate 91 is accessible via neighboring Bradford, Vermont.

Air 
Dean Memorial Airport in neighboring Haverhill is the closest airport. The closest commercial airport is Lebanon Municipal Airport in Lebanon. The closest international airport is Burlington International Airport in South Burlington, Vermont.

Rail 

Demographics

As of the census of 2010, there were 790 people, 334 households, and 228 families residing in the town. The population density was 19.8 people per square mile (7.6/km). There were 474 housing units at an average density of 11.9 per square mile (4.6/km). The racial makeup of the town was 97.2% White, 0.1% African American, 0.9% Asian, 0.4% Native American and Alaskan Native, and 1.4% from two or more races. Hispanic or Latino of any race were 0.8% of the population.

There were 334 households in Piermont, out of which 24.6% had children under the age of 18 living with them, 57.8% were married couples living together, 7.5% had a female householder with no husband present, and 31.7% were non-families. 24.6% of all households were made up of individuals, and 9.6% had someone living alone who was 65 years of age or older. The average household size was 2.37, and the average family size was 2.83.

In the town, the population was spread out, with 19.0% under the age of 18, 5.1% between the ages of 18 and 24, 22.8% between 25 and 44, 36.3% between 45 and 64, and 16.8% who were 65 years of age or older. The median age was 46.8 years. The town was 49.4% male and 50.6% female.

For the period 2010–2014, the estimated median income for a household in the town was $72,841, and the median income for a family was $91,875. Male full-time workers had a median income of $49,688 versus $41,250 for females. The per capita income for the town was $38,089. About 3.4% of families and 6.8% of the total population were below the poverty line, including 6.3% of those under age 18 and 6.0% of those age 65 or over.

Education

K–12 
Piermont operates grades K–8 through the Piermont Village School. Piermont has no high schools in the town, and grades 9–12 are tuitioned to a number of area high schools. Students may also attend the technical schools Hartford Career & Technology Center in White River Junction, Vermont, and River Bend Career and Technical Center in Bradford, Vermont. Students may also choose to attend St. Johnsbury Academy in St. Johnsbury, VT.

Higher education 

The closest four-year public institution is Plymouth State University in Plymouth, New Hampshire. The closest four-year private institution is Dartmouth College in Hanover. The closest two-year community colleges are River Valley Community College in Claremont and Lakes Region Community College in Laconia.

Sites of interest
 Lake Tarleton State Park
 Camp Walt Whitman
 Kingswood Camp for Boys

Notable people 

 Ira Hobart Evans (1844–1922), businessman, philanthropist, military officer; recipient of the Medal of Honor
 John Elkins (1815–1898), businessman, Wisconsin State Representative

References

External links
 
 Piermont Public Library
 Piermont Historical Society & Museum
 New Hampshire Economic and Labor Market Information Bureau Profile

Towns in Grafton County, New Hampshire
New Hampshire populated places on the Connecticut River
Towns in New Hampshire
1764 establishments in New Hampshire